Surrender is a 1927 American romance film directed by Edward Sloman and written by Charles Kenyon, Edward J. Montagne and Albert DeMond. It is based on the 1915 play Lea Lyon by Alexander Brody. The film stars Mary Philbin, Ivan Mosjukine, Otto Matieson, Nigel De Brulier, Otto Fries and Daniel Makarenko. The film was released on November 3, 1927, by Universal Pictures.

Cast        
Mary Philbin as Lea Lyon
Ivan Mosjukine as Constantin 
Nigel De Brulier as Rabbi Mendel Lyon
Otto Matiesen as Joshua
Otto Fries as Tarras
Daniel Makarenko as General Davidoff

References

External links
 

1927 films
American romance films
1920s romance films
Universal Pictures films
Films directed by Edward Sloman
American silent feature films
American black-and-white films
1920s English-language films
1920s American films